The Very Best of Dragon is a compilation album by the New Zealand band Dragon. The album was first released in New Zealand in March 2010 and peaked at number 4.

Track listing

Charts

Certifications

Release history

References

Dragon (band) albums
Sony Music Australia albums
2010 greatest hits albums